Per Ankersjö  (born 1971) is a Swedish politician. He is a member of the Centre Party. He was elected to the Stockholm City Council after the 2006 elections and re-elected in the 2010 elections.

References

Centre Party (Sweden) politicians
1971 births
Living people
Politicians from Stockholm
21st-century Swedish politicians